Drosophila funebris is a species of fruit fly. It was originally described by Johan Christian Fabricius in 1787, and placed in the genus Musca but is now the type species of the paraphyletic genus Drosophila. Drosophila funebris is a member of the Immigrans-tripunctata radiation of the subgenus Drosophila.

Gallery

References 

f
Insects described in 1787